Paladin Pie is a Dungeons & Dragons-themed pizzeria in Portland, Oregon.

Description 
Paladin Pie is a Dungeons & Dragons-themed pizzeria in northeast Portland's Concordia neighborhood. Pizza varieties include the Druid (roasted mushrooms, parmesan cream, mozzarella, basil, and lemon), the Jazz Cabbage (mozzarella, cheddar, bacon, and kimchi), and the Red Dragon (Buffalo chicken with Frank's, chicken, red onion, and house ranch).

History 
Owner Leo Brill, a former pizza chef at Oven and Shaker, started the business as a backyard pop-up restaurant in the summer of 2020. In January 2022, Bill announced plans to operate the business from a food cart on Alberta Street in northeast Portland. The cart opened on March 4, 2022.

Brill has donated business proceeds to various nonprofit organizations and other groups, including Don't Shoot PDX, For The Gworls, Minnesota Freedom Fund, the National Black Justice Coalition, and The Okra Project. Flynn McEchron is a business partner.

Reception 
Brooke Jackson-Glidden included Paladin Pie in Eater Portland 2022 overview of "Where to Eat and Drink on Alberta". She also included the pizzeria in a list of "The Hottest New Restaurants and Food Carts in Portland", calling the Jazz Cabbage a "particular standout".

See also 

 Pizza in Portland, Oregon

References

External links 

 

2020 establishments in Oregon
Concordia, Portland, Oregon
Food carts in Portland, Oregon
Pizzerias in Portland, Oregon
Restaurants established in 2020